Early general elections were held in Jordan on 23 January 2013. Voter turnout was reported to be 56.6%.

Electoral system
Prior to the elections a new electoral law was passed, allowing voters to cast two ballots; one for a candidate in their constituency and one for party lists elected by proportional representation at the national level. In addition, the number of seats reserved for candidates of political parties was raised from 17 to 27 out of the 150 seats in the House of Representatives. Fifteen seats were reserved for women, whilst the remaining 108 seats were elected by first-past-the-post system in constituencies. A new Independent Election Commission was also created.

Around 70% of eligible voters were reported to have registered to vote. Although over two-thirds of the population lived in urban areas at the time of the election, cities were allocated less than one-third of seats in the House of Representatives.

Campaign
In July 2012, the Muslim Brotherhood-affiliated Islamic Action Front announced that the party would boycott the elections, stating that the changes to the electoral law increasing the number of seats for political parties did not go far enough and that the constituency system favoured tribal candidates. Opposition parties had demanded that 50% of seats be reserved for parties rather than the 18% provided for.

A total of 1,400 candidates registered to contest the elections, of which 22 were described as Islamists.

Conduct
The Islamist opposition complained that the elections had been marred by fraud, claiming that turnout had been artificially inflated during the last two hours of voting. The voting period had been extended by an hour to 20:00.

The National Democratic Institute for International Affairs (NDI) reported that there had been a "marked improvement in procedures and administration", but also noted shortcomings and irregularities. The NDI also criticised unequal constituency sizes, claiming that they increased tribal cleavages.

Results

Aftermath
Following the elections Interim Prime Minister Abdullah Ensour was appointed to the post on a permanent basis, with King Abdullah consulting Parliament on membership of the cabinet for the first time. With 19 members, the new cabinet was the smallest in four decades.

References

Elections in Jordan
2013 in Jordan
Jordan
Election and referendum articles with incomplete results
January 2013 events in Asia